The Mexican national ice hockey team is the national men's ice hockey team of Mexico. The team is governed by the Mexico Ice Hockey Federation (FDMHSH) and a member of the International Ice Hockey Federation (IIHF). Mexico is currently ranked 35th in the world rankings and compete in the IIHF World Championship Division II Group B.

History
Mexico joined the IIHF on 30 April 1985. They played their first game during the 2000 World Championships, losing to Belgium (5–0). Since then they have participated in every World Championship and are currently in Division II B. It is the only Latin American team that competes in IIHF tournaments. Mexico hosted the Pan American Ice Hockey Tournament from 2014 to 2017, losing to the Canada Selects once (7–0) and to Colombia twice (4–3 and 3–2 in shootout) in the Pan American Tournament final three times. In 2017, Mexico won its first Pan American Tournament, went undefeated , and defeating Colombia 1–0 in the final.

Tournament record

World Championships

Pan American Tournament

References

External links
 
IIHF profile
National Teams of Ice Hockey

National ice hockey teams in the Americas
Ice hockey in Mexico
Ice hockey